(James) Ian Langtry (born January 2, 1939) (died April 8, 2021) is a former government official and educator.

He is the son of late Reverend H. J. Langtry and I. M. Langtry (née Eagleson). In 1959, he married Eileen Roberta Beatrice (née Nesbitt) (died 1999). He was educated at Coleraine Academical Institution; Queen’s University, Belfast (Sullivan School.; BSc 1st Class, Physics).

He was: Assistant Master, Bangor Grammar School (1960–1961); Lecturer, Belfast College of Technology (1961–1966); Assistant Director of Examinations/Recruitment, Civil Service Commission (1966–1970); Principal, Department of Education and Science (1970–1976), Assistant Secretary (1976–1982); Under Secretary (1982–1987); Under Secretary, DHSS (1987–1988).

External links
(James) Ian Langtry at the Who's Who official Web-site 2008

1939 births
Living people